XHCQR-FM is a noncommercial radio station in Cancún, Quintana Roo, Mexico. Broadcasting on 99.3 FM, XHCQR is owned by Gaia FM, A.C.

History

The permit for XHCQR was awarded on January 11, 2012, to Gaia FM, A.C., along with additional permits for stations in Colima City (XHOMA-FM), Puerto Vallarta (XHGAI-FM) and Playa del Carmen (XHLAYA-FM).

In 2015, Gaia FM, A.C. was subsumed into Capital Media, which is a commercial radio station owner. The stations kept their format with a name change to Capital Pirata FM. In a 2018 filing with the IFT, Capital declared that it did not directly operate the Gaia FM stations but instead provided them with less than five percent of their broadcast day in news capsules and other material.

Like most Capital stations, XHCQR adopted the new Lokura FM adult hits format in 2020.

References

2012 establishments in Mexico
Radio stations established in 2012
Radio stations in Quintana Roo
Spanish-language radio stations